Stuck Together is a 2021 French comedy film directed by Dany Boon, written by Laurence Arné and Dany Boon and starring Dany Boon, Liliane Rovère and Yvan Attal. It was released on 20 October 2021 by Netflix.

Plot
Due to the COVID-19 pandemic and containment, the streets of Paris are deserted. While some have fled in the provinces, seven families remain in their building at 8 rue de l'Humanité in the 11th arrondissement. Among the inhabitants of the building are in particular the owner of the bistro who is doing everything to open her establishment, an ambitious scientist wanting to find the vaccine, a hypochondriac and his lawyer wife who is trying to reconcile her professional life and her family life, a sports coach who gives his lessons by videoconference but begins to gain weight, his 7-month pregnant partner who makes the buzz with an anti-COVID song. There is also a self-made man who is successful in business but finds out that he does not even have the grade level of his 8 year old son. This confinement also has positive effects: During these three months of confinement, all these inhabitants will experience joys and anxieties, discover each other, get closer, argue and reconcile.

Cast
Dany Boon as Martin
Liliane Rovère as Louise
Yvan Attal as Gabriel
Laurence Arné as Claire
François Damiens as Tony
Alison Wheeler as Agathe
Tom Leeb as Samuel
Jorge Calvo as Diego
Nawell Madani as Leïla
 as Isabelle
Élie Semoun as policeman
Randiane Naly as policewoman
Eve Margnat as Victoire
Clara Cirera as Paola
Nick Mukuko as policeman
Yann Papin as policeman
Lucas Phiv as Kevin Louison
Milo Machado Graner as Basile
Rose de Kervenoaël as Louna

References

External links

French comedy films
French-language Netflix original films
Films about the COVID-19 pandemic
Films directed by Dany Boon
2020s French films